Ashby is an unincorporated community in Grant County, Nebraska, United States.  Its elevation is 3,843 feet (1,173 m), and it is located at  (42.0219276, -101.9276811). It lies along Nebraska Highway 2, 9 miles (14½ km) west-northwest of Hyannis, the county seat of Grant County.  It has a post office with the ZIP code 69333.

History
Ashby got its start following construction of the railroad through the territory. It was named after the town of Ashby, Massachusetts by a railroad official.

The Ashby post office was established in 1908.

References

Unincorporated communities in Grant County, Nebraska
Unincorporated communities in Nebraska